Clarence Barr (June 8, 1876 – June 1968) was an American actor of the silent era. He appeared in 90 films between 1912 and 1918. He played Abraham Lincoln in the 1918 film Madam Who?

Selected filmography
 Black and White (1913)
 The Ranchero's Revenge (1913)
 Almost a Wild Man (1913)
 Madam Who? (1918)

References

External links

1876 births
1968 deaths
American male film actors
American male silent film actors
Male actors from Nebraska
Date of death missing
20th-century American male actors